The Theban Tomb TT27 is located in El-Assasif. It forms part of the Theban Necropolis, situated on the west bank of the Nile opposite Luxor. The tomb is the burial place of the ancient Egyptian official, Sheshonk.

Sheshonk was the chief steward of the God's Wife of Amun Ankhnesneferibre, dating to the reign of king Apries and king Amasis II. Sheshonk was the son of Harsiesi and his wife Tahibet. Harsiesi was a chief steward of the God's Wife as well.

See also
 List of Theban tombs

References

Further reading
 
Aa.Vv. Tomba Tebana 27 di Sheshonq all'Asasif. III rapporto preliminare, VicOr 9, 1993 (Roma 1994).

Buildings and structures completed in the 6th century BC
Theban tombs